Christos Daralexis (Greek: Χρήστος Δαραλέξης, 1870 - 1951) was a Greek historian, a politician and a theatrical writer.

Biography
Daralexis was born in Pyrgos, Elis, and was a relative of the Avgerinos family.  He was a well minded Athenian and one of the courteous changes in Athens' aristocracy.  He was elected a politician in 1900.  He tried vainly and repeatedly elected in the next elections from 1904 until 1910.  It was a union member of the Journalists' Union of the Athens Daily Newspapers (ESIEA) and ran president.  One of the theatrical works that he completed was Faia kai Nymfaia (Φαιά και Νυμφαία).

References
The first version of the article is translated and is based from the article at the Greek Wikipedia (el:Main Page)

1870 births
1951 deaths
People from Pyrgos, Elis
Greek writers
Greek politicians